Sturisomatichthys tamanae is a species of armored catfish of the family Loricariidae endemic to Colombia where it occurs in the San Juan River basin.  This species grows to a length of  TL.

References
 

Harttiini
Fish of South America
Freshwater fish of Colombia
Taxa named by Charles Tate Regan
Fish described in 1912